The 1980 RTHK Top 10 Gold Songs Awards was held in 1980 for the 1979 music season.

Top 10 song awards
The top 10 songs (十大中文金曲) of 1980 are as follows.

References
 RTHK top 10 gold song awards 1980

RTHK Top 10 Gold Songs Awards
Rthk Top 10 Gold Songs Awards, 1980
Rthk Top 10 Gold Songs Awards, 1980